KCOQ (98.9 FM) is a radio station licensed to Steamboat Springs, Colorado. The station broadcasts a classic rock format and is owned by Radio Partners LLC.

On June 18, 2018, KCOQ changed their format from sports to classic rock, branded as "98.9 The River".

The station is an affiliate of the syndicated Pink Floyd program "Floydian Slip."

References

External links
KCOQ's official website

COQ (FM)
Classic rock radio stations in the United States
Radio stations established in 2012
2012 establishments in Colorado